Iduronate 2-sulfatase (EC 3.1.6.13; systematic name L-iduronate-2-sulfate 2-sulfohydrolase) is a sulfatase enzyme associated with Hunter syndrome. It catalyses hydrolysis of the 2-sulfate groups of the L-iduronate 2-sulfate units of dermatan sulfate, heparan sulfate and heparin.

Function 

Iduronate 2-sulfatase is required for the lysosomal degradation of heparan sulfate and dermatan sulfate. Mutations in this X-chromosome gene that result in enzymatic deficiency lead to the sex-linked mucopolysaccharidosis type II, also known as Hunter syndrome. At least 174 disease-causing mutations in this gene have been discovered.  Iduronate-2-sulfatase has a strong sequence homology with human arylsulfatases A, B, and C, and human glucosamine-6-sulfatase.  A splice variant of this gene has been described.

See also 
 Idursulfase

References

Further reading

External links 
  GeneReviews/NIH/NCBI/UW entry on Mucopolysaccharidosis Type II

EC 3.1.6